Mycobacterium montefiorense is a species of bacteria which cause granulomatous skin disease of moray eels.  Sequence analysis, of the 16S rRNA gene reveals M. montefiorense is most closely related to Mycobacterium triplex, an opportunistic pathogen of humans.

M. montefiorense was named after the Montefiore Medical Center, Bronx, N.Y., the medical institution where it was isolated.

Description
M. montefiorense are acid-fast rods which grow on Middlebrook 7H10 media at 25 °C to form small, transparent, slow-growing colonies.

M. montefiorense do not grow at temperatures above 30 °C.

The strain ATCC BAA-256 = CCUG 51898 = DSM 44602.

Pathogenesis
M. montefiorense has been demonstrated to cause granulomatous skin disease of moray eels.

References

External links
Type strain of Mycobacterium montefiorense at BacDive -  the Bacterial Diversity Metadatabase

Acid-fast bacilli
montefiorense
Bacteria described in 2003